Michael Andre Lewis, aka Mandré, (December 7, 1948 in Omaha, Nebraska – January 31, 2012 in Shreveport, Louisiana) was an American musician known for his synthesizer recordings at Motown. As Andre Lewis he also contributed to Labelle's Moon Shadow and Whitney Houston's Just Whitney. He toured or recorded with Grant Green, The Who, Labelle, Buddy Miles Band, Maxayn, Rufus, White Chocolate, Earth Wind and Fire and Frank Zappa. He was also band leader for Johnny Guitar Watson.

His debut single as Mandré "Solar Flight (Opus I)", was a hit from a self-titled debut album Mandré. He formerly played with his band Maxayn, named after the singer, and later his wife, Maxayn Lewis, (born Paulette Parker).

Discography

Albums
Mandré - 1977
Mandré Two - 1978
M3000 - 1979
Mandré 4 - 1982
A Difficult Journey - 2008

Singles
 "Solar Flight (Opus 1)" 1977
 "Keep Tryin'" 1977
 Opus III
 "Fair Game" / "Light Years" (Opus IV) 1978
 "Spirit Groove" 1979
 "Freakin's Fine"

References

1948 births
2012 deaths
American rhythm and blues keyboardists
American rhythm and blues bass guitarists
American funk keyboardists
American rock keyboardists
American funk bass guitarists
American rock bass guitarists
Musicians from Omaha, Nebraska